Richard Hay may refer to:

Richard L. Hay (geologist) (1929–2006), American geologist
Richard L. Hay (scenic designer) (born 1929), American scenic designer
Richard Hay (politician) (born 1952), Indian politician

See also
Richard Hays (disambiguation)
Richard Hayes (disambiguation)